The Murray Inlet is a large inlet on the south-west side of Melville Island, Northwest Territories, Canada. It joins the Liddon Gulf and M'Clure Strait to the south-west.

Inlets of the Northwest Territories
Inlets of the Arctic Ocean